Post-Williams House is a historic home located at Poughkeepsie, Dutchess County, New York. It was built about 1877 and is a -story, three-bay-wide, Late Victorian-style dwelling. It features a pitched roof and a -story tower with zig-zag moulding.

It was added to the National Register of Historic Places in 1982.

References

Houses on the National Register of Historic Places in New York (state)
Victorian architecture in New York (state)
Houses completed in 1877
Houses in Poughkeepsie, New York
National Register of Historic Places in Poughkeepsie, New York
1877 establishments in New York (state)